The Erotic Art Museum is a museum dedicated to erotic art located in the German red-light district of Hamburg's Reeperbahn. The museum opened in November 1992 at 69 Bernhard-Nocht-Straße, and in 1997 it moved to Nobistor, a street running between the Reeperbahn and Louise-Schroeder-Straße. The museum closed in fall 2007. In 2018, the museum reopened.

See also
 List of museums and cultural institutions in Hamburg

References

External links

 The museum's web site

Sex museums in Germany
Museums in Hamburg
Buildings and structures in Hamburg-Mitte
Defunct museums in Germany